The 1976 Little All-America college football team, also known as the College Division All-America football team, is composed of college football players from small colleges and universities who were selected by the Associated Press (AP) as the best players at each position.

First team

Offense
 Tight end - Scott Levenhagen, Western Illinois
 Wide receiver - Danny Fulton, Nebraska-Omaha
 Offensive tackles - Ed Burns, Tennessee Tech; Paul Wagner, Coe
 Offensive guards - Rocky Gullickson, Moorhead State; Mark Van Horn, Akron
 Center -  Ted Petersen, Eastern Illinois
 Quarterback - Richard Ritchie, Texas A&I
 Running backs - Augusta Lee, Alcorn State; Ted McKnight, Minnesota-Duluth; Jim Van Wagner, Michigan Tech

Defense
 Defensive ends - Jim Haslett, Indiana (PA); Dave Marreel, Midland Lutheran
 Defensive tackles - Ricky Locklear, Elon; Larry Warren, Alcorn State
 Middle guard - Roy Samuelsen, Springfield
 Linebackers - Rick Budde, North Dakota State; Tim Collins, Tennessee-Chattanooga; Larry Grunewald, Texas A&I
 Defensive backs - Greg Anderson, Montana; Greg Lee, Western Illinois; Jimmy Parker, Wabash

See also
 1976 College Football All-America Team

References

Little All-America college football team
Little All-America college football team
Little All-America college football team
Little All-America college football teams